Dhanote railway station is located in Dhanote, Lodhran district of Punjab province, Pakistan.

See also
 List of railway stations in Pakistan
 Pakistan Railways

References

External links

Railway stations in Lodhran District
Railway stations on Lodhran–Raiwind Line